Umm al Qanafidh  is a town in the Amman Governorate of north-western Jordan.

References

External Links 
Photos of Umm el-Qanafid at the American Center of Research

Populated places in Amman Governorate